Unfair contract is a concept of some legal jurisdictions.  It may refer to:

English law
(see Unfair terms in English contract law)
 Unfair Terms in Consumer Contracts Regulations 1999
 Unfair Contract Terms Act 1977
 Consumer Protection from Unfair Trading Regulations 2008

Scottish law

European law

Australian law
 Australian Consumer Law

See also
 Unconscionability, a similar, though much broader concept.